Mill Hill is a   Local Nature Reserve on the northern outskirts of Shoreham-by-Sea in West Sussex. It is owned by Adur District Council and managed by the council and the South Downs Joint Committee.

This site has chalk grassland, scrub and secondary woodland. It is one of the best areas in Sussex for butterflies, with 29 species recorded, including the Adonis blue. More than 160 species of flowering plant have been recorded, such as horseshoe vetch.

There is access from the road called Mill Hill.

References

Local Nature Reserves in West Sussex